Kenneth Robert Tuff Baumann (born August 8, 1989) is an American actor, writer, publisher and book designer. He became most known for playing Ben Boykewich on The Secret Life of the American Teenager. He is the author of numerous novels, nonfiction stories, essays, and poems.  He also owns and co-owns many other companies such as Sator Press, which was the series designer for Boss Fight Books, he is also a co-founder of the iOS app Sweetspot. In 2014, Baumann enrolled at St. John's College in Santa Fe, New Mexico.

Personal life
Baumann was born in Urbana, Illinois. He grew up in Abilene, Texas, where his family owned and operated a miniature horse ranch and wildlife rescue. He married actress Aviva Farber on June 16, 2012, in Malibu, California.

Baumann is a member of Giving What We Can, a community of people who pledge to 10% of their income to effective charities.

Book design

Along with serving as the series designer for Boss Fight Books, Baumann designed the covers for Fuckscapes by Sean Kilpatrick, and each issue of No Colony, Sator Press.

Published works

Novels
 The Country (2019) 
 Solip (New York: Tyrant Books 2013) 
 Say, Cut, Map (2013)

Nonfiction
 Eat the Flowers (2018)
 EarthBound (2014)

Filmography

References

External links
 Ken Baumann's website
 
 Sator Press

1989 births
21st-century American male actors
Male actors from Texas
American male television actors
Living people
Writers from Urbana, Illinois
People with Crohn's disease